Enrique Martín is the birth name of singer Ricky Martin.

Enrique Martín may also refer to:

 Enrique Martín (footballer, born 1950), Mexican footballer
 Enrique Martín (footballer, born 1956), Spanish footballer and football manager